Jeff Wulkan, (born Jeffrey Michael Wulkan, June 11, 1983, Red Bank, New Jersey), is an American entrepreneur and reality TV star, notable for being the founder and CEO of Bikini Barbers. He is most famous for being the eccentric star of the AXS TV show Bikini Barbershop, which first aired February 19, 2012. It is a reality TV show set in his salon, Bikini Barbers, and revolves around the, often dysfunctional, day-to-day life of Wulkan and the girls he employs. Wulkan is also a winemaker. He founded Mile High Wines, an aviation themed wine company inspired by his love of traveling and tasting fine wine from all over the world.



Early life 
Wulkan grew up in Oceanport, New Jersey and attended Shore Regional High School. He went on to achieve a Bachelor's Degree in Aerospace Science at Utah Valley University.

Career

Aviation
Wulkan earned his commercial pilots licence in 2004.

Business
Bikini Barbers flagship shop opened in February 2011, in Long Branch, New Jersey. Since opening his first shop Wulkan has earned the nickname 'The Hugh Hefner of Hair'.
Wulkan created Mile High Wines in January 2019, an aviation themed wine company inspired by his love of tasting fine wine from all over the globe.

In December 2020, Wulkan founded tech company HowTu, an online portal that connects users with qualified instructors.

In May 2021, Wulkan also co-founded company and e-commerce site “Lighten Up a Little” including ‘tongue and cheek’ type apparel, candles and pet gear.

Television
Bikini Barbershop starring Wulkan, aired for the first time in February 2012. It ran for 14 episodes.

References

External links
Bikini Barbers official website
AXS TV Bikini Barbershop

Living people
1983 births
People from Oceanport, New Jersey
Participants in American reality television series